Steven Roy Swanson (born December 3, 1960 in Syracuse, New York) is an American engineer and retired NASA astronaut. Swanson has flown two shuttle flights, STS-117 and STS-119, and one Soyuz flight, TMA-12M. All of the flights were to the International Space Station. He has logged over 195 days in space and completed five spacewalks totaling 28 hours and 5 minutes. Swanson has served in other roles at NASA, such as a CAPCOM for both International Space Station and Space Shuttle missions. His awards and honors include the NASA Exceptional Achievement Medal and the JSC Certificate of Accommodation. Prior to becoming a NASA astronaut, Swanson worked for GTE in Phoenix, Arizona, as a software engineer.  He is married and has three children.

Early life 
Although born in Syracuse, New York, Swanson considers Steamboat Springs, Colorado to be his home. He graduated from Steamboat Springs High School in 1979, and went on to the University of Colorado to receive a bachelor's degree in engineering physics in 1983. In 1986, he received a master of applied science in computer systems from Florida Atlantic University. He later received a doctorate in computer science from Texas A&M University in 1998.

NASA career 
Swanson joined NASA in 1987 as a systems engineer and a flight engineer working on the Shuttle Training Aircraft. He was selected as an astronaut in May 1998. His first mission was STS-117, which launched June 2007. Swanson was a mission specialist and flight engineer on this flight. He served as a mission specialist and lead spacewalker on STS-119, which launched March 15, 2009 and landed on March 28. He launched to the International Space Station as a member of Expedition 39/40 on March 25, 2014 from the Baikonur Cosmodrome in Kazakhstan and returned to Earth on September 11, 2014. NASA announced Swanson's retirement in August 2015. Since then he has worked at Boise State University as a distinguished educator in residence assisting with programs such as the NASA SUITS Program.

Steven Swanson is a Browncoat, or fan of Joss Whedon's Serenity and Firefly. He added copies of the movie and box set of the TV series to the ISS Movie Library on STS-117 in June 2007.

References

External links 
 Steve Swanson Website
 

 Russian Federal Space Agency ISS Crews biography
 Spacefacts biography of Steven Swanson

1960 births
Living people
American astronauts
American computer scientists
University of Colorado alumni
Florida Atlantic University alumni
Texas A&M University alumni
People from Syracuse, New York
Commanders of the International Space Station
Engineers from New York (state)
Space Shuttle program astronauts
Spacewalkers